The Weiwuying Metropolitan Park is a metropolitan park (one type of Taiwan national park) in Fengshan District, Kaohsiung, Taiwan.

History
During the Qing Dynasty rule of Taiwan, Fongshan was an important military area. During the Japanese rule, the Japanese viewed Kaohsiung as a base to develop the southern region of Taiwan and started to deploy armies and set up warehouses there called the Fongshan Warehouse. After the handover of Taiwan from Japan to the Republic of China in 1945, the Kuomintang government continued the military purpose of the camp until 1979, when the military council ruled that the camp was no longer suitable for military purposes.

After that time, units in the camp started to be merged or evacuated. Though the camp had been demilitarized, no consensus about the development of the area was reached. In March 1992, a public hearing was held to determine the fate of the area. A group of people who advocated environmental protection and arts established the Council for Promoting Weiwuying Metropolitan Park and began to lobby for setting up a natural and ecological metropolitan park. After more than 10 years of discussions and efforts, a direction was thus settled to establish the park. After 20 years of efforts by civil groups, the Weiwuying Metropolitan Park was finally established in 2010.

Though the camp was demilitarized, no consensus about Weiwuyin's development was reached. In March 1992, a public hearing entitled “Whether Weiwuying should serve as a college or park?” was held. At that time, a group of people who advocated environmental protection and arts established a “Council for Promoting Weiwuying Metropolitan Park” and began to lobby for setting up a natural and ecological metropolitan park. After more than 10 years of discussions and effort, a direction was thus settled and a green dream of years for the south finally came true!

Architecture
The park spans over an area of 47 hectares. It consists of lake, children playground and historical buildings.

Transportation
The park is accessible within walking distance south from Weiwuying Station of Kaohsiung MRT.

See also
 List of parks in Taiwan

References

External links

 

2010 establishments in Taiwan
Parks established in 2010
Parks in Kaohsiung